The 2016–17 Southern Counties East Football League season was the 51st in the history of the Southern Counties East Football League, a football competition in England, and is the first year the competition has two divisions, having merged with the Kent Invicta Football League.

Premier Division

The Premier Division consisted of 17 clubs from the previous season Southern Counties East Football League along with three new clubs:
 Bearsted, promoted as winners of the Kent Invicta League 
 Sheppey United, promoted as runners-up in the Kent Invicta League
 Whitstable Town, relegated from the Isthmian League

League table

Promotion criteria
To be promoted at the end of the season a team must:
 Have applied to be considered for promotion by 30 November 2016	
 Pass a ground grading examination by 31 March 2017	
 Finish the season in a position higher than that of any other team also achieving criteria 1 and 2	
 Finish the season in one of the top three positions

The following eight teams achieved criterion one:
 AFC Croydon Athletic
 Ashford United (missed application deadline but successfully appealed)
 Corinthian
 Crowborough Athletic
 Hollands & Blair
 Sevenoaks Town
 Sheppey United
 Whitstable Town

Results

Top scorers

Division One

Before the start of the season Kent Invicta Football League merged with Southern Counties East League and became Division One.

Division One consisted of 17 clubs from the previous Kent Invicta League season along with two new clubs:
 Holmesdale, relegated from the Premier Division
 Snodland Town, promoted from Kent County League Premier Division

Also, two clubs changed their names:
 APM Contrast was renamed K Sports
 Seven Acre & Sidcup was renamed Sporting Club Thamesmead

League table

Results

Top scorers

References

External links
 Southern Counties East Football League Official Website

2016-17
9